George R. Martin Elementary School (formerly Lena and George R. Martin Elementary School) is an elementary school in Seekonk, Massachusetts. It serves the K-5 student population of the town located south of Route 44.

The building is named for donor George Rutherford Martin (1877-1961). Martin was a Shipping Foreman at the Universal Winding Company in East Providence. He left $135,000 in his will to the town of Seekonk for the building of a school, which was built on land purchased from the Kent family.

External links
George R. Martin Elementary School website

References

Seekonk, Massachusetts
Public elementary schools in Massachusetts
Schools in Bristol County, Massachusetts